Dogwatch Saddle is a snow saddle between Mount Brøgger and Mount Morrison, separating the glacial catchments of Benson Glacier and Cleveland Glacier in the Prince Albert Mountains, Victoria Land. A New Zealand Antarctic Research Programme field party made a late night temporary camp on the saddle in January 1990. The name commemorates the midnight hours kept at this location.

References 

Mountain passes of Victoria Land
Scott Coast